The Chickasawhay River is a river, about  long, in southeastern Mississippi in the United States.  It is a principal tributary of the Pascagoula River, which flows to the Gulf of Mexico.  The Chickasawhay's tributaries also drain a portion of western Alabama. The name "Chickasawhay" comes from the Choctaw word chikashsha-ahi, literally "Chickasaw potato".

Geology

The Chickasawhay River is known for its abundance of fossil deposits, placed over a period of 35 million years. Dr. Mark Puckett, Chairman of the Department of Geography and Geology at the University of Southern Mississippi, has studied the area for years. According to Pucket, many species of fossils from the river were the first of their kind to be studied anywhere on earth. Some sealife fossils that are now found worldwide, were first discovered in deposits along this river, from a period when it was part of the sea. Some species are named for local towns and landmarks.

Course
The Chickasawhay is formed by the confluence of the Chunky River and Okatibbee Creek, where Enterprise developed in northwestern Clarke County, and it flows generally southward through present-day Clarke, Wayne and Greene counties into northern George County, where it meets the Leaf River to form the Pascagoula River just north of the Merrill bridge. The Chickasawhay flows past the towns of Stonewall, Quitman, Shubuta, Waynesboro, Buckatunna, State Line and Leakesville. Shubuta, like many other towns along the rivers, was developed by European Americans from a trading post near an indigenous Choctaw village.

See also
List of rivers of Mississippi

References

External links
"Chickasawhay River", Columbia Gazetteer of North America

Bodies of water of Clarke County, Mississippi
Bodies of water of George County, Mississippi
Bodies of water of Greene County, Mississippi
Rivers of Mississippi
Bodies of water of Wayne County, Mississippi
Mississippi placenames of Native American origin